The Best of Abbey Road is jazz vocalist Gary Williams's fifth album, released in 2010. It is a compilation album of songs from three albums recorded at Abbey Road Studios: Alone Together, In the Lounge with Gary Williams and Swingin' on Broadway.

Critical reception 

The album was received well by critics and reviewers.

Clive Fuller of In Tune commented: "Gary can have the lightest of touches with a song as well as a more robust approach when it is needed. The arrangements bring out the best from the song the musicians and the singer... Who could ever forget Vincent Youman's “More Than You Know” or Cole Porter’s “You’re Sensational”; Rodgers & Hammerstein’s “Surrey with the Fringe on Top”; the Gershwin’s “Isn’t it a Pity” and these are only 4 reasons why you should buy this album."

Albert Killman of Journey into Melody said: "How often have we remarked "they don't make records like that anymore." Well, they still do and here's the glowing proof. There are many so-called "tribute" singers who just seem to go through the motions. Gary, however, shows how it could be and should be done, but then it's Gary who has the talent, and boy, does it show."

Track listing

References

External links 
 Official Gary Williams web site: The Best of Abbey Road

2010 compilation albums
Gary Williams (singer) albums